National Route 141 is a national highway of Japan connecting Nirasaki, Yamanashi and Ueda, Nagano in Japan, with a total length of .

History
When designated on 18 May 1953, Route 141 originally ran from Shimizu to Ueda. The section from Shimizu to Nirasaki was redesignated as Route 52 on 1 April 1963, shortening Route 141 to its current route.

See also

References

141
Roads in Nagano Prefecture
Roads in Yamanashi Prefecture